Nakhodka Bay or Nakhodka Gulf is a bay of the Peter the Great Gulf of the Sea of Japan, on which is sited the port of Nakhodka. It is part of the Primorsky Krai of Russia. The Lisy Island protects the bay from open sea waves. Literally the word means Eureka! in the Russian language.

The bay is one of the largest transport junctions in the Russian Far East; vessel traffic is extremely intensive here. There are four ports in the Gulf and four ship repairing yards. It is a basic port for vessels of largest companies, such as Primorsk Shipping Corporation (Prisco) and the base of the Active Marine Fishery.

Nakhodka Bay was discovered in 1859 by the Russian corvette Amerika ("America"), which sought shelter in the bay during a storm. The old name "Gulf of America" was officially changed into Gulf of Nakhodka in the heat of the Cold War in the late 1970s, only because it sounded as if it was named after the United States.  Nakhodka  is Russian for "a lucky find" or eureka. The name is a reference that for some act of nature, this is the only place on the Russian Pacific coast that the sea never freezes. As such, its harbors are superior even to those of a much larger port of Vladivostok. The first Russian settlement, the village Amerikanka, was founded in 1907 and named after the corvette.

Bays of Primorsky Krai
Nakhodka